The Bahia class was a pair of scout cruisers built for Brazil by Armstrong Whitworth in the United Kingdom, based on a design that borrowed heavily from the British  scout cruisers.  The class comprised the lead ship  and her sister , along with a canceled third ship, Ceara. Both were named after states of Brazil.  As a class, they were the fastest cruisers in the world when commissioned, and the first in the Brazilian Navy to use steam turbines for propulsion.

In the mid-1920s, both ships were extensively modernized with three new Brown–Curtis turbine engines and six new Thornycroft boilers, and, in the process, was converted from coal-burning ships to oil-burning. The refit resulted in a striking aesthetic change, with the exhaust being trunked into three funnels, instead of two. The armament was also modified; three  Madsen guns, a  Hotchkiss machine gun, and four  torpedo tubes were added.

In the Second World War, both were used as convoy escorts. On 4 July 1945, Bahia was lost after an accident caused a massive explosion which incapacitated the ship and sunk her within minutes, resulting a large loss of life.  Rio Grande do Sul survived the war and was scrapped in 1948.

Design
The class's design borrowed heavily from the British  scout cruisers. The ships displaced , and their dimensions were  overall,  between perpendiculars,  at the beam, and a draft of  forward,  amidships, and  aft.

The class was armed with ten /50 caliber, six QF 3 pounder /50 caliber guns and two  torpedo tubes. The class was lightly armored with only  of deck armor, with the conning tower having . Vickers would later pitch the Bahia design to the Ottoman Navy in 1912, but nothing came of it prior to the outbreak of the First World War.

Construction
The class was part of a large 1904 naval building program by Brazil. Also planned as part of this were the two  dreadnoughts, ten s, three submarines and a submarine tender. With a design that borrowed heavily from the British Adventure-class scout cruisers, Bahias keel was laid first on 19 August 1907 in Armstrong Whitworth's Elswick, Newcastle upon Tyne yard, followed by Rio Grande do Sul 30 August 1907. Construction took about a year and a half, and both ships were launched in 1909.  Both ships were completed and commissioned into the navy in 1910. As a class, Bahia and Rio Grande do Sul were the fastest cruisers in the world when they were commissioned, and the first in the Brazilian Navy to utilize steam turbines for propulsion.

Modernization

In the mid-1920s, the class underwent significant modernization. The original five turbines were replaced by three Brown–Curtiss turbines, while the original ten boilers were replaced by six Thornycroft oil-burning boilers, which necessitated the addition of a third funnel. The former coal bunkers, along with some of the space freed up by the decrease in boilers, were converted to hold  of oil. All of the boats on board were replaced, and three  Madsen guns, a  Hotchkiss machine gun, and four  torpedo tubes were added to give the ship a defense against aircraft and more power against surface ships.

The class was modernized again twice during the Second World War, in both 1942 and 1944. The modernizations were not as extensively as it was in the 1920s; the Brazilian Navy's official history of Bahia reports these but does not specify what modifications the ship underwent in which year. Two  guns were replaced with  L/23 AA guns, Madsen guns were replaced with seven Oerlikon 20 mm cannons in single mounts, and a director for these guns was installed. Two depth charge tracks were added, improved range-finders were added to the  guns, and sonar and radar were fitted, in addition to other minor modifications.

Loss of the Bahia

On 4 July 1945, Bahia was acting as a plane guard for transport aircraft flying from the Atlantic to Pacific theaters of war. While Bahias gunners were firing at a kite for anti-aircraft practice, one fired too low and hit depth charges stored near the stern of the ship. A massive explosion incapacitated the ship and sank her within minutes, resulting a large loss of life.

Notes

Footnotes

References
 
 
 
 

 
1909 ships
World War I cruisers of Brazil
World War II cruisers of Brazil